The Bank of Israel is the central bank of Israel. The bank's headquarters is located in Kiryat HaMemshala in Jerusalem with a branch office in Tel Aviv. The current governor is Amir Yaron.

The primary objective of the Bank of Israel is to maintain price stability and the stability of the financial system in Israel. It also administers and implements monetary policy in Israel, conducts foreign exchange operations, supervises and regulates the banking system, takes care of the foreign reserves and operations of the financial market infrastructure. The Bank of Israel has, under Article 41 and 44 of its Statute, the exclusive right to issue Israeli Shekel banknotes and coins.

History
When Israel gained independence in 1948, the power of note issuance was vested with the Anglo-Palestine Bank, which was refounded as Bank Leumi in 1950. Monetary policy and banking supervision remained controlled by the Ministry of Finance.

The Bank of Israel was founded on 24 August 1954, when the Knesset passed the Bank of Israel Law, which ceded the currency issuing and regulatory functions of the Ministry of Finance to the newly formed bank. Control over foreign currency exchange was not given to the bank until 1978. The bank was made completely independent in 1985 and since 1992, the bank manages its monetary policy so as to meet the inflation target set by the Israeli government - which is today a range of between 1 and 3 percent per annum, considered as price stability. Additionally, the bank manages the country's Foreign Exchange Reserves.

In 2010, the Bank of Israel was ranked first among central banks for its efficient functioning, according to IMD's World Competitiveness Yearbook.

In March 2010, the Knesset approved a new Bank of Israel Law which took effect on 1 June 2010. The new law defines the goals of the bank and gives the bank independence in determining its policy tools and the way of implementing them. The law changed the framework in which major decisions are made at the Bank of Israel. Decisions regarding the interest rate and monetary policy, in general, are made by a Monetary Committee, while the managerial decisions are approved by a Supervisory Council. This brings the Bank of Israel more in line with the decision making procedures of other financial institutions.

Buildings
The current headquarters in Jerusalem was designed by the architecture office of Arieh Sharon and his son, Eldar Sharon. They won the first prize for the project in 1966 and worked at the design until 1974. The building was inaugurated in 1981. The design resembles an inverted pyramid and was inspired by the Boston City Hall. The building underwent a major overhaul and renovation between 2015 and 2018.

Governors 
 David Horowitz, 1954–1971
 Moshe Sanbar, 1971–1976
 Arnon Gafni, 1976–1981
 Moshe Mendelbaum, 1982–1986
 Michael Bruno, 1986–1991
 Jacob A. Frenkel, 1991–2000
 David Klein, 2000–2005
 Stanley Fischer, 2005–2013
 Karnit Flug, 2013–2018
 Nadine Baudot-Trajtenberg, acting governor from 14 November until December 24 2018.
 Amir Yaron, 2018-present

See also

 Israeli new shekel
 Banking in Israel
 Economy of Israel
 List of banks in Israel
 List of central banks

References

Further reading 
 Daniel Maman and Zeev Rosenhek. 2011. The Israeli Central Bank: Political Economy, Global Logics and Local Actors, Routledge.

External links

 Bank of Israel website

Israel
Isr
Economy of Israel
1954 establishments in Israel
Banks established in 1954
Finance in Israel
Buildings and structures in Israel